John Dugdale (born 8 March 1936) is a former Australian rules footballer who played for North Melbourne in the Victorian Football League (VFL). He shares with Jock Spencer the club record of seven times topping their season ending goalkicking charts. From 1957 until 1964, Dugdale was North Melbourne's top goalkicker in all but one season.

A 1958 All Australian, Dugdale was captain of the Kangaroos from 1968 to 1970. He won a Best and Fairest in his first season as captain. He played a total of 248 games between 1955 and 1970, scoring 358 goals.

He was named in the forward pocket in North Melbourne's official 'Team of the Century'

References

External links

1936 births
Living people
Australian rules footballers from Melbourne
North Melbourne Football Club players
North Melbourne Football Club coaches
Coburg Football Club coaches
Syd Barker Medal winners
All-Australians (1953–1988)
People from North Melbourne